Mervana Jugić-Salkić and Renata Voráčová were the defending champions, having won the event in 2013, however Jugić-Salkić retired from professional tennis earlier in 2014. Voráčová partnered with Yuliya Beygelzimer as the first seeds, but lost in the semifinals.

Stephanie Vogt and Zheng Saisai won the title, defeating Margarita Gasparyan and Evgeniya Rodina in the final, 6–4, 6–2.

Seeds

Draw

References 
 Draw

Empire Slovak Open - Doubles